Serres is one of the regional units of Greece, in the geographic region of Macedonia. It is part of the Region of Central Macedonia. Its capital is the city of Serres. The total population reaches just over 175,000.

Geography

The mountains are Orvelos to the north, Menoikio to the east, Pangaio to the southeast, Kerdylio to the southwest, Vertiskos to the west, parts of Krousi to the west and portions of the Kerkini lies to the northwest.  The regional unit borders on Thessaloniki to the southwest, Kilkis to the west, North Macedonia with the Novo Selo Municipality to the northwest, the Blagoevgrad Province of Bulgaria to the north, Drama to the northeast and Kavala to the east. The Strymonian Gulf lies to the south along with the Strymonas delta.  Lake Kerkini was a lake located in the southern portion which is now drained. 41% of the regional unit are arable and most of the lands are near the Strymonas river which flows from Bulgaria and empties into the Strymonian Gulf.  Another river is the Angitis in the eastern part of the regional unit, with the ravine and caves near Alistrati.

The regional unit has many archaeological and historical features including Serres, Amphipolis, several monasteries, and Metaxa near the border with Bulgaria. The regional unit is also a tourist attraction including Lailia, rich in forests, a skiing resort in the central portion, lake Kerkini which is a reservoir supplying water to the farmlands. Fishing is common within Ano Poroia especially during the summer months and famous Alistrati's caves and the nearby Aggitis ravine.

The southern part around the Strymonas valley has a Mediterranean climate, the rest is predominantly continental with cold winters in higher elevations.

History

In modern times, Serres, like the rest of Macedonia was contested territory between Greece, Bulgaria, Serbia and the Ottoman Empire. After its liberation from the Turks by the Bulgarians in the First Balkan War, Serres became a part of Greece at the end of the Second Balkan War. During the National Schism, it was occupied by Bulgaria again only to form part of Greece at the end of the war. During the Second World War Bulgaria occupied Serres and launched a campaign of Bulgarisation. It was liberated in 1944.

A substantial portion of the population of the regional unit are descendants of refugees which came from Eastern Thrace which is now Northwestern Turkey, Asia Minor and from Pontus during the Greco-Turkish War.

Administration

The regional unit Serres is subdivided into 7 municipalities. These are (number as in the map in the infobox):
Amfipoli (2)
Emmanouil Pappas (4)
Irakleia (5)
Nea Zichni (6)
Serres (1)
Sintiki (7)
Visaltia (3)

Prefecture

As a part of the 2011 Kallikratis government reform, the Serres regional unit was created out of the former Serres Prefecture. The prefecture had the same territory as the present regional unit. At the same time, the municipalities were reorganised, according to the table below.

Provinces

Before the abolishment of the provinces of Greece in 2006, the Serres prefecture was subdivided into the following provinces:

Transport
The main roads of Serres regional unit are:
Motorway 2 (Igoumenitsa - Thessaloniki - Amfipoli - Alexandroupoli)
Motorway 25 (Thessaloniki - Serres - Sidirokastro - Bulgaria)
Greek National Road 2 (Florina - Thessaloniki - Amfipoli - Alexandroupoli)
Greek National Road 12 (Thessaloniki - Serres - Drama - Kavala)
Greek National Road 59 (Amfipoli - Nea Zichni) 
Greek National Road 63 (Serres - Sidirokastro - Bulgaria)
Greek National Road 65 (Thessaloniki - Kilkis - Sidirokastro)

The Thessaloniki–Alexandroupoli railway passes through Serres and Sidirokastro.

Persons
Constantine Karamanlis (8 March 1907 in Proti - 23 April 1998), a former Greek prime minister and president
Emmanouel Pappas, hero of the Greek Independence Struggle
Glykeria, famous Greek singer (of Asia Minor Hellenic ancestry)
Ioannis Melissanidis, a Greek gymnast athlete
Nansy Stergiopoulou, of the all girl band Hi-5, family originally from Serres.

Sporting teams
The Panserraikos F.C. association football club, based in Serres, plays in the Football League 2.

See also

List of settlements in the Serres regional unit

References

External links
Serres Prefecture Official Website
Serres General Hospital Official Website
 Alistrati's cave
An up-to-date portal with information regarding the Serres Prefecture

 
Prefectures of Greece
1915 establishments in Greece
Regional units of Central Macedonia